State Agency for Compulsory Health Insurance under the cabinet of Azerbaijan (azərb. Azərbaycan Respublikasının Nazirlər Kabineti yanında Icbari Tibbi Sığorta üzrə Dövlət Agentliyi) is a legal entity that provides the implementation of mandatory medical insurance, accumulating funds to finance medical services within the basic package in Azerbaijan.

History 
The State Agency for Compulsory Health Insurance was established by order of the president of Azerbaijan No. 2592 dated December 27, 2007, and started its activity on the basis of presidential decree No. 765 dated February 15, 2016. According to presidential decree No. 1255 of November 24, 2016, the state agency for compulsory health insurance was established as a legal entity under public law "State Agency for compulsory health insurance".

On October 27, 2015, Zaur Aliyev was appointed as a director of the State Agency for Compulsory Health Insurance.

Activity 
According to the decree of the president of Azerbaijan dated November 29, 2016, the city of Mingachevir and Yevlakh district were selected as pilot territories for the application of compulsory medical insurance in Azerbaijan. According to the decree of February 16, 2018 Agdash district was also included in the pilot project.

Since January 1, 2020, citizens registered in 24 regions of the country (Guba, Gusar, Khachmaz, Shabran, Siyazan, Khizi, Shamakhy, Ismayilli, Agsu, Gobustan, Balaken, Zagatala, Gah, Shaki, Oguz, Gabala, Goychay, Ujar, Zardab, Kurdamir, Mingachevir, Agdash, Yevlakh and Nakhichevan Autonomous Republic) receive medical services within the framework of mandatory medical insurance.

Cooperation 
Cooperation between the State Agency for Compulsory Health Insurance and the United Nations Children's Fund (UNICEF) was established on January 16, 2019.

See also 
Azerbaijan

Medicine in Azerbaijan

Azerbaijani Management Union of Medical Territorial Units

Ministry of Healthcare (Azerbaijan)

References

External links 
 Official website

Government agencies of Azerbaijan